Sriramanagar  is a village in the southern state of Karnataka, India. It is located in the Gangawati taluk of Koppal district in Karnataka.

Demographics
As of 2001 India census, Sriramanagar had a population of 8864 with 4446 males and 4418 females.

See also
 Koppal
 Districts of Karnataka

References

External links
 http://Koppal.nic.in/

Villages in Koppal district